Paul Simon in Concert: Live Rhymin' is a live album by Paul Simon, released in March 1974 by Columbia Records. It was recorded in the wake of the release of There Goes Rhymin' Simon, which produced a number of hit singles ("Kodachrome" and "Loves Me Like a Rock") and radio staples ("Something So Right" and "Take Me to the Mardi Gras"), at the University of Notre Dame in Indiana and Carnegie Hall in New York during Simon's 1973–74 tour.

Simon was joined by Urubamba and the Jessy Dixon Singers, who performed on "Jesus Is the Answer".

The album was Simon's first live release and showed him performing Simon & Garfunkel songs solo in concert for the first time. The variety of songs and richness of styles helped with the album's appeal. Most notable was Simon's fascination with gospel, something that materialized in the arrangements on many of the songs, taking distance from Simon's classical folk early style.

Near the end of the album, an audience member calls out for Simon to "say a few words." He replies: "Say a few words? Well, let's hope that we continue to live."

The album was a moderate success. It reached No. 33 in the U.S. and was eventually certified gold by the RIAA. However, it failed to chart at all in the UK. Further, two of the live performances were released as a single as part of the promotion for the album: the breakthrough Simon & Garfunkel "The Sound of Silence" as the A-side, along with Simon's debut single "Mother and Child Reunion" on the B-side.

Track listing
All tracks composed by Paul Simon, except where indicated.

Side 1
"Me and Julio Down by the Schoolyard" – 2:47
"Homeward Bound" – 2:45
"American Tune" – 3:58
"El Cóndor Pasa (If I Could)" (Simon, Jorge Milchberg, Daniel Alomía Robles) – 4:08
"Duncan" – 5:11
"The Boxer" – 6:11

Side 2
"Mother and Child Reunion" – 4:00
"The Sound of Silence" – 4:27
"Jesus Is the Answer" (Andraé Crouch, Sandra Crouch) – 3:28
"Bridge over Troubled Water" – 7:10
"Loves Me Like a Rock" – 3:16
"America" – 4:35

 Sides one and two were combined as tracks 1–12 on CD reissues.

2011 Reissue bonus tracks
"Kodachrome" – 2:55
"Something So Right" – 4:34

Charts

Chart positions

Certifications

References

Paul Simon live albums
Albums produced by Phil Ramone
1974 live albums
Columbia Records live albums
Albums recorded at Carnegie Hall